Frimley Lodge Park is a  recreational site located between Frimley Green and Mytchett in Surrey, England.

The park was largely developed in 1987–88 to include several football and rugby fields, two children's play areas and  trim trail.  It is also the location of the Frimley Lodge Park Miniature Railway, which runs in the northern wooded part of the park. The park is also the home ground of Frimley Green Cricket Club, who play Sunday friendly matches between May and September.

Since February 2010 the park has been home to Frimley Lodge parkrun which takes place on Saturday mornings at 9:00am.  It is run over two laps in the park and along the Basingstoke Canal towpath, and runners meet by the pavilion beforehand.

The park won a design award on completion and a Green Flag Award for 2007/08.

The lodge is also home to the First Frimley Green and Mytchett Scout Group.

External links

 Frimley Green Cricket Club website
 Frimley Lodge Parkrun

Parks and open spaces in Surrey